The Sovereign's Medal for Volunteers is a Canadian medal intended to honour volunteers who have made a significant and continual contribution to their community, either in Canada or abroad. The medal was initially conceived by Governor General Roméo LeBlanc as the Governor General's Caring Canadian Award and created in November 1995, to award volunteers. It was replaced on 15 July 2015 by the Sovereign's Medal for Volunteers.

Eligibility and selection
The medal is intended for an individual whose unpaid, voluntary contributions, behind-the-scenes, provide extraordinary help or care to individuals or groups in the community. Nominees must have brought honour to Canada through their work, and may belong to any age group; recipients typically have not previously been recognized by a national or provincial honour. 

An independent advisory committee meets to review submissions. Once a nomination for a candidate is received, research is undertaken to confirm facts and a summary of information about each candidate is presented to the advisory committee for review. The committee submits recommendations to the governor general.

The certificate and lapel pin are presented to recipients by a dignitary, such as a lieutenant governor, territorial commissioner, or mayor. On occasion, the governor general presents the medal during regional visits.

All previous honouree of the Caring Canadian Award will receive the Sovereign's Medal for Volunteers. As of November 30, 2017, the award has been presented to over 3300 Canadians across the country.

See also
List of awards presented by the Governor General of Canada
Ontario Medal for Good Citizenship
Saskatchewan Volunteer Medal
British Columbia Medal of Good Citizenship

References

Canadian awards